An entity is something that exists as itself, as a subject or as an object, actually or potentially, concretely or abstractly, physically or not. It does not need to be of material existence. In particular, abstractions and legal fictions are usually regarded as entities. In general, there is also no presumption that an entity is animate, or present.

The term is broad in scope and may refer to animals; natural features such as mountains; inanimate objects such as tables; numbers or sets as symbols written on a paper; human contrivances such as laws, corporations and academic disciplines; or supernatural beings such as gods and spirits.

The adjectival form is entitative.

Etymology
The word entity is derived from the Latin entitas, which in turn derives from the Latin ens meaning "being" or "existing" (compare English essence). Entity may hence literally be taken to mean "thing which exists".

In philosophy 

Ontology is the study of concepts of existence, and of recognition of entities. The words ontic and entity are derived respectively from the ancient Greek and Latin present participles that mean "being".

In law and politics 

In law, a legal entity is an entity that is capable of bearing legal rights and obligations, such as a natural person or an artificial person (e.g. business entity or a corporate entity).

In politics, entity is used as term for territorial divisions of some countries (e.g. Bosnia and Herzegovina).

In medicine 

In medicine, a disease entity is an illness due to a particular definite cause or to a specific pathological process. While a disease entity is not defined by a syndrome, it may or may not be manifest in one or more particular syndromes.

In computer science 

In computer science, an entity is an object that has an identity, which is independent of the changes of its attributes.  It represents long-lived information relevant for the users and is usually stored in a database.

See also 

 Digital identity
 Entity–relationship model
 Entity-control-boundary
 Entity realism, a form of scientific realism
 Entitativity
 Everything
 Html entity
 Non-physical entity
 Object (philosophy)

References

Main topic articles
Concepts in metaphysics
Data modeling diagrams
Objects
Broad-concept articles